Escontria is a genus of cactus. The only species is Escontria chiotilla, the chiotilla or jiotilla. The species originates from Mexico (Guerrero, Michoacán, Oaxaca, southern Puebla).

This is a tree-like cactus, up to 7 metres tall. It has 7 or 8 acute ribs, and very close or confluent areoles. It bears dark red fruit comparable in appearance and texture to Pitaya, but smaller (3,5 cm).

References 

 
 Escontria On-line Guide to the positive identification of Members of the Cactus Family: Escontria

Echinocereeae
Cacti of Mexico
Endemic flora of Mexico
Flora of Guerrero
Flora of Michoacán
Flora of Oaxaca
Flora of Puebla
Cactoideae genera
Monotypic Caryophyllales genera